The 2008–09 Ligue Magnus season was the 88th season of the Ligue Magnus, the top level of ice hockey in France. 14 teams participated in the league, and Brûleurs de Loups de Grenoble won their sixth league title.

Regular season

Playoffs

Relegation
 Avalanche Mont-Blanc - Bisons de Neuilly-sur-Marne 3:1 (6:2, 4:1, 3:4 OT, 5:1)

External links
 Season on hockeyarchives.info

1
Fra
Ligue Magnus seasons